Something Borrowed is a 2011 American romantic comedy film based on Emily Giffin's 2005 book of the same name, directed by Luke Greenfield, starring Ginnifer Goodwin, Kate Hudson, Colin Egglesfield, and John Krasinski and distributed by Warner Bros.

Plot
Darcy throws her friend Rachel a surprise 30th birthday. She is a young, serious-minded single attorney in New York City, whereas Darcy is free-spirited, Rachel's polar opposite. Darcy is engaged to Dex, and Rachel's close friend Ethan is her confidante.

Darcy gets drunk at the party, so Dex takes her home, but returns for her Chanel purse. Rachel offers to help look for it, and he gets her a drink for her birthday. Afterwards, a drunk Rachel mentions the crush she had on him in law school. Sharing a cab, she apologizes, he kisses her and they wake up in bed together to Darcy's frantic message that Dex never came home.

Flashbacks show Rachel and Dex in law school, growing closer and culminating in a pivotal evening. Over drinks, they are sharing personal stories, but Darcy showing up breaks the romantic mood. When she teases Rachel about Dex, she says he is just a friend. He's disappointed, but she doesn't notice. Darcy relentlessly flirts with Dex, so Rachel leaves.

Meanwhile, in present day, things between Rachel and Dex remain awkward as the wedding plans proceed and Darcy hosts frequent gatherings in the Hamptons. Rachel says she is having sex with other men (first Marcus, then Ethan). Darcy tells Rachel she cheated on Dex once with someone from work.

Ethan is frustrated at Rachel for never standing up for herself against Darcy. Friends with Rachel and sometimes foe to Darcy, he reluctantly agrees to tolerate Rachel's lies. He soon tires of the charade, trying to tell the group about Dex and Rachel, but she hits him with a racket, angering him for not confessing.

Dex's mother's depression is being kept in check by her happiness with the upcoming wedding. Months after first being secretly intimate, Dex tries to talk to Rachel about what's between them; they skip Darcy's July 4 weekend in the Hamptons to stay in the city.

Running into his parents, Dex's father tells him to end it, as his wants are less important than the overall right. He stuck by Dex’s mom with her troubles so Dex should not abandon Darcy so close to the wedding.

As the wedding nears, Dex and Rachel speak less and less. At the beach, Ethan almost exposes their secret, who is frustrated with Rachel for lying to people she cares about. That night at the Hamptons bar, Rachel finally asks Dex to call off the wedding so they can be together, but he says he can't.

Ethan moves to London for work, so Rachel goes to visit him a week before the wedding. He confesses he loves her, but accepts it is not mutual. Deciding to go to the New York wedding, she acknowledges she has to support Darcy. She finds Dex on her doorstep on her return to New York City, as he called it off.

Rachel is ecstatic until Darcy arrives to talk. Dex quickly hides, overhearing her confessing that she has been cheating with Marcus (while Dex was cheating with Rachel). She is now pregnant with Marcus' child, and says they are very happy. On her way out she sees Dex's jacket and searches the apartment for him. When he reveals himself, she finally realises her best friend is the other woman. Dex and Darcy argue, and she yells at Rachel through tears that she hates her and never wants to speak to her again, storming out.

Two months later, Rachel and Darcy run into each other. Darcy acts excited about her pregnancy, saying this is the happiest she has ever been. When Darcy notices Rachel has picked up one of Dex's shirts from the dry cleaner, she sees they are still together.

As they begin to walk away, Darcy turns and genuinely says that she truly is happy. Rachel smiles widely and says she's glad. Dex then calls, who is waiting on a bench around the corner for her. Joining him with a broad smile, he takes her hand as they walk together down the street.

In a mid-credits scene, Darcy surprises Ethan in London; he tries to ignore her, briskly sneaking away. The screen turns black with text indicating that the story is to be continued.

Cast

 Ginnifer Goodwin as Rachel
 Kate Hudson as Darcy
 Peyton List as young Darcy
 Colin Egglesfield as Dex
 John Krasinski as Ethan
 Steve Howey as Marcus
 Ashley Williams as Claire
 Geoff Pierson as Dexter Thaler Sr.
 Jill Eikenberry as Bridget Thaler

Reception

Critical response
Something Borrowed received negative reviews. Review aggregator Rotten Tomatoes reports that 15% of 117 critics have given the film a positive review, with an average rating of 4.00/10. The site's critical consensus reads: "In spite of solid performances from Kate Hudson and John Krasinski, Something Borrowed is an unpleasant misfire that lives down to its title." Metacritic assigned the film a weighted average score of 36 out of 100, based on 30 critics, indicating "generally unfavorable reviews". Audiences polled by CinemaScore gave the film an average grade of "B" on an A+ to F scale.

Box office
Something Borrowed grossed $39 million in the United States and Canada and $21.1 million in other territories for a worldwide total of $60.1 million, against a budget of $35 million.

Possible sequel
In 2014, Emily Giffin confirmed that she had written the script for a sequel, Something Blue, based on her own 2005 novel of the same name. In February 2016, Giffin continued to suggest that she was working on the film sequel, though no other parties had issued any statements supporting this.

 there was still no official news from any production companies, despite a May 2017 Facebook post from Giffin.

References

External links
 
 
 Something Borrowed soundtrack

2011 romantic comedy films
2011 films
Alcon Entertainment films
Summit Entertainment films
Films based on romance novels
Films set in London
Films set in New York City
Films shot in London
Films shot in New York City
Warner Bros. films
Films based on American novels
Films directed by Luke Greenfield
Films scored by Alex Wurman
2010s English-language films
American romantic comedy films